Marikoppa is a mountain, between Larssen and Paulsen Peak in the Allardyce Range of South Georgia.  The name, which is known locally, was used in 1950 by H.B. Paulsen.  Koppa is a descriptive Finnish word meaning "basket with a lid on top."  The mountain was surveyed by the South Georgia Survey in 1951–52.

References

Mountains and hills of South Georgia